Luca Pascal Schnellbacher (born 6 May 1994) is a German professional footballer who plays as a striker for  club SV Elversberg.

Club career
On 21 May 2019, SC Preußen Münster announced that they had signed Schnellbacher for the upcoming 2019–20 season.

References

External links
 
 

1994 births
Living people
Association football forwards
German footballers
SV Wehen Wiesbaden players
VfR Aalen players
SC Preußen Münster players
SV Elversberg players
3. Liga players
Regionalliga players
People from Groß-Umstadt
Footballers from Hesse
Sportspeople from Darmstadt (region)